The Coonamble railway line is a railway line in New South Wales, Australia. The line branches from the Main West Line at Dubbo. It opened in 1903, and carried passenger traffic until the 1970s. 900/950 class railmotors were first introduced on the service between Dubbo and Coonamble. It continues to carry goods traffic, predominantly grain. The disused historic Coonamble railway station is currently at risk of demolition due to vandalism and high maintenance costs. The line is owned by the Rail Infrastructure Corporation of New South Wales, however operations over the line are managed by the Australian Rail Track Corporation (ARTC) under a 60-year agreement. The northern section of the line features track that is in generally poor condition with derailments not uncommon. However, a NSW Government project completed in 2017 restored the line, including by laying new steel sleepers and renewing bridges.

See also 
 Rail transport in New South Wales

References 

Regional railway lines in New South Wales
Standard gauge railways in Australia
Railway lines opened in 1903